Hakan Canbazoğlu (born 28 November 1987) is a Turkish professional footballer who plays as a goalkeeper for Elazığspor.

Professional career
A youth product of Galatasaray and Sivasspor, Canbazoğlu began his career with Orhangazispor. He had stints with Gölcükspor, Nazilli Belediyespor, Başakşehir, Nazilli Belediyespor and Gaziosmanpaşaspor in the Turkish semi-pro leagues. He transferred to Osmanlıspor, where he made his professional debut in a 1-0 Süper Lig loss to Çaykur Rizespor on 22 November 2015. He transferred to Yeni Malatyaspor, before returning to the Süper Lig with Erzurumspor. He followed that up with stints at Boluspor and Şanlıurfaspor.

References

External links
 
 
 

1987 births
Footballers from Istanbul
Living people
Turkish footballers
Turkey youth international footballers
Association football goalkeepers
Gölcükspor footballers
Nazilli Belediyespor footballers
İstanbul Başakşehir F.K. players
Gaziosmanpaşaspor footballers
Ankaraspor footballers
Yeni Malatyaspor footballers
Büyükşehir Belediye Erzurumspor footballers
Boluspor footballers
Şanlıurfaspor footballers
Elazığspor footballers
Süper Lig players
TFF First League players
TFF Second League players
TFF Third League players